Skiti (σκήτη) may refer to:
 A monastic  community, see Skete
Skiti, Kozani, a village in the Kozani regional unit
Skiti, Larissa, a village in the Larissa regional unit